The following is a list of Anglican churches in the Americas.

Anglican Communion churches
The Anglican churches in North and South America include the following member churches of the Anglican Communion. 
In descending order by size:
 The Episcopal Church, in the United States (including Puerto Rico and the United States Virgin Islands), Colombia, the Dominican Republic, Ecuador, Haiti, Honduras, Venezuela, and the British Virgin Islands (2,369,477 members, including members outside the Americas in Hawaii, Taiwan and Europe).
 The Anglican Church of Canada, (645,000 members)
 The Church in the Province of the West Indies, in Anguilla, Aruba, Antigua, the Bahamas, Barbados, Barbuda, Belize, the Cayman Islands, Dominica, French Guiana, Guyana, Jamaica, Montserrat, Saba, Saint Barthélemy, Sint Eustatius, Saint Kitts and Nevis, St. Martin, Suriname, Trinidad and Tobago, Turks and Caicos, and the Windward Islands (770,000 members) 
 The Anglican Episcopal Church of Brazil,  (120,000 members)
 The Anglican Church of Mexico, (25,000 members) 
 The Anglican Church in Central America, in Costa Rica, El Salvador, Guatemala, Nicaragua, and Panama (24,800 members)
 The Anglican Church of South America, in Argentina, Bolivia, Canada, Chile, Paraguay, Peru, and Uruguay (22,490 members) 
 The Episcopal Church of Cuba, (extraprovincial to its Metropolitan Council) (10,000 members) 
 The Anglican Church of Bermuda (extraprovincial to the Archbishop of Canterbury)
 The Parish of the Falkland Islands (extraprovincial to the Archbishop of Canterbury)
 The Church of South India maintains several churches in the United States under an agreement with the Episcopal Church.

Non‐Anglican Communion churches
The following churches in the Americas, in the Anglican tradition, are not members of the Anglican Communion.
In alphabetical order:
 The Anglican Catholic Church, in the United States, Colombia, Ecuador, and Haiti (10,000 members)
 The Anglican Catholic Church of Canada, in Canada
 The Anglican Church in America, in the United States, Belize, El Salvador, Guatemala, and Mexico (5,200 members)
 The Anglican Church in North America, in the United States and Canada
 The Anglican Episcopal Church, in the United States
 The Anglican Mission in the Americas (a missionary jurisdiction in the USA under the authority of the Episcopal Church of the Province of Rwanda and the Anglican Church of the Province of South East Asia) in the Anglican Communion
 The Anglican Orthodox Church, in the United States and Canada
 The Anglican Province of America, in the United States (6,000 members)
 The Anglican Province of Christ the King, in the United States (8,000 members)
 The Christian Episcopal Church, in the United States and Canada
 The Communion of Evangelical Episcopal Churches, in the United States and Canada
 The Continuing Anglican Church, has provinces in the Americas, Africa and Asia. (Legally incorporated. Formally headquartered in Illinois, United States, now in Kobe, Japan)   
 The Convocation of Anglicans in North America, in the United States (a missionary jurisdiction in the USA under the authority the Church of Nigeria in the Anglican Communion)
 The Diocese of the Great Lakes, in the United States and Canada
 The Diocese of the Holy Cross, in the United States
 The Episcopal Diocese of South Carolina
 The Episcopal Missionary Church, in the United States
 The Holy Catholic Church—Western Rite, in the United States, Bolivia, Colombia, Cuba, Panama, and Peru
 The Orthodox Anglican Church, in the United States
 The Progressive Episcopal Church 
 The Reformed Episcopal Church, in the United States, Canada, Cuba and Brazil  (13,400 members, including members outside the Americas in Germany, India and Liberia.)
Reformed Anglican Church of Brazil
 The United Episcopal Church of North America, in the United States

Anglican Communion church bodies
Continuing Anglican movement
Ecclesiology
Anglican